Perl is a municipality in Merzig-Wadern, Saarland, Germany. In 2020 its population was 8,824.

Geography

Overview
It is situated on the right bank of the river Moselle, on the border with Luxembourg and France, approximately 25 km southeast of Luxembourg City. It is joined by a bridge across the Moselle with Schengen in Luxembourg and by a second bridge between Nennig and Remich. A fine Roman mosaic has been found in the village of Nennig.

Subdivision
The municipality consists of Perl and 13 villages (Ortsteil):

Administration
 1989 - 2007 : Anton Hoffmann, CDU
 2007 - 2015 : Bruno Schmitt, SPD
 2015 -      : Ralf Uhlenbruch, CDU

Education
There have been schools in the municipality of Perl for several centuries, with the oldest schooling and school building records dating back to the year 1743. The Deutsch-Luxemburgisches Schengen-Lyzeum Perl is the first cross-border grammar school which offers both the German and Luxembourg diplomas.

Day Care Centres 
 Day Care St. Franziskus Besch
 Day Care Center St. Martin Nennig
 Day Care Center St. Quirinus Perl
 Day Care Center Leukbachtal Oberleuken

Primary school 
 Primary school Dreiländereck Perl

Grammar school 
 German-Luxembourgish Schengen-Lyzeum Perl

Main sights

Roman mosaic floor
The Roman mosaic in Nennig is the second largest mosaic north of the Alps, with a size of 160m². It was rebuilt in 1874 and restored in 1960. The mosaic has a 15.65 m × 10.30 m large, ornamental decorated surface, which is a gem that exceeds all mosaics that have been found in the Moselle region in Roman palaces and mansions.

Roman Villa Borg
The Roman Villa Borg has been reconstructed faithfully with lobbies, public baths, gardens and Roman tavern and also displays archaeological finds. Original recipes of the Roman gourmet Apicius are used for cooking.

Palace von Nell and parc von Nell
In 1733 the hereditary tenant of the Trier Cathedral Chapter constructed a stately house (palace), which later fell into the possession of a family from Nell. The residential building is a nine-axle, two-storey building with a front length of 24.30 m and a high kerb roof. Opposite the palace is a garden portal with a double-barreled external staircase that leads to the "Parc of Nell", which was transformed to a Baroque garden as part of the project "Gärten ohne Grenzen".

Besch military cemetery
The military cemetery commemorates the fallen of the Second World War. Three large stone crosses stand atop a blown up bunker. The cemetery is the last resting place of 1279 German dead and also 950 war victims of other nations.

Schloss Berg
Schloss Berg in Nennig consists of a lower and upper castle. The lower castle is private property and the upper castle has been rebuilt as the Renaissance-Schloss. Today it is a luxury hotel, a gourmet restaurant and a modern casino.

Personalities

Born in Perl 
 Karl Eduard Heusner (1843-1891), Vice Admiral
 Albert Grégoire (1865-1949), Member of the Reichstag
 Nikolaus Simmer (1902-1986), politician (NSDAP) and mayor of Koblenz (1940-1945)
 Aloysius Winter (1931-2011), professor of theology
 Karl Peter Fixemer (born 1931), Entrepreneur
 Rudolf Heinz (born 1937), philosopher, psychoanalyst and musicologist
 Edmund Kütten (born 1948), politician, member of parliament (since 2004)

Connected to Perl 
 Christian Bau (born 1971), chef

References

External links

 Perl official website

Germany–Luxembourg border crossings
France–Germany border crossings
Merzig-Wadern